Justinian, was published in 1998 by Tor Books. It is a novel by American writer Harry Turtledove writing under the pseudonym H. N. Turteltaub, a name he used for a time when writing historical fiction.

Plot summary

The book is in the format of a fictional memoir written by Byzantine Emperor Justinian II, with brief interludes from a soldier named Myakes, who was close to Justinian throughout much of the emperor's life. The book follows Justinian's time before and after taking the throne, as well as his overthrow, mutilation and exile in the Crimea, his subsequent return to power (following a possibly apocryphal nose-job), his insane quest for revenge, and his finally being unseated a second time and executed.  Myakes, who had been blinded and exiled to a monastery after Justinian's final defeat, listens as a fellow monk named Brother Elpidios reads the memoir out loud, and occasionally interrupts with commentary or criticism.  In the end,  Elipidos, who had been contemplating writing his own history, hides the book as he believes he could not properly separate the good from the evil in Justinian's life.

Historical accuracy

In an author's note, Turtledove, who has a doctorate in Byzantine history, discusses the historical accuracy of the books.  He notes that the reconstructive surgery which he describes Justinian undergoing is one which Indian surgeons were actually performing at the time and is one speculation about how the exiled emperor may have restored his nose.  He says that most of the departures from the historical record were done for dramatic purposes, such as the creation of Myakes as a companion and sounding board for Justinian, and changes to the religious debates of the time, which Turtledove believed would appear hopelessly obscurantist to most modern readers.

Major themes 
The central theme of the book seems to be "power corrupts, and absolute power corrupts absolutely", but this is not necessarily the case. Justinian is a man who believes he can do no wrong. After all, he is on the throne because God wants him to be there. If he is acting in the name of God, how can he be doing evil?

Another central theme of the book is the importance of religion in the 8th century. Justinian's father is shown convening a synod, and both Justinian and his father lead battles against the newly arisen Muslim faith. The Popes, who are considered by many in Constantinople to be merely the Bishop of Rome, are shown as not having as much influence then as they would have in later centuries.

References

1998 American novels
Novels by Harry Turtledove
Novels set in the Byzantine Empire
Works published under a pseudonym
Tor Books books
Novels set in the 7th century